Ron Luitjen Lucia van der Hoff (born 26 March 1978 in Venray, Limburg) is an athlete from the Netherlands, who competes in archery.

Van der Hoff competed in archery at the 2004 Summer Olympics. In men's individual archery, he won his first match, upsetting Butch Johnson of the US. Advancing to the round of 32, he was defeated in the second round of elimination.  His final rank was 30th overall.

Van der Hoff was also a member of the Netherlands' 5th-place men's archery team at the 2004 Summer Olympics. This team had placed 6th at the 2003 World Championship.

References
sports-reference

1978 births
Living people
Dutch male archers
Archers at the 2004 Summer Olympics
Olympic archers of the Netherlands
People from Venray
Competitors at the 2001 World Games
Sportspeople from Limburg (Netherlands)